Frank Ellsworth Graeff (1860 — 1919) was an American  hymnwriter and minister in the Philadelphia Conference of the Methodist Episcopal Church. He is chiefly known as the author of "Does Jesus Care?" which was composed by J. Lincoln Hall and published in 1905 by Hall-Mark Company in the hymn New Songs of Gospel volume two.

Life 
Graeff was born on December 19, 1860 in Tamaqua, Pennsylvania. At a young age, he was admitted into the Pennsylvania Conference of the Methodist Episcopal Church in 1890. He was known for his story telling ability which earned him the title "sunshine minister". Graeff wrote 200 hymns and a novel The Minister's Twin.
Graeff died in July 29, 1919 at Ocean Grove, New Jersey.

References 

American Christian hymnwriters
1860 births
1919 deaths
19th-century American musicians